The 2018–19 Equatoguinean Primera División is the 41st season of the Equatoguinean Primera División, the top-tier football league in Equatorial Guinea, since its establishment in 1979.

Regional stage
The 24 teams are divided into Región Insular and Región Continental, with 12 teams in each region.

The top three teams from each region qualify for the Liguilla Nacional. The bottom two teams from each region are relegated.

Región Insular

Región Continental

Liguilla Nacional
Played between 16 and 30 June 2019 in Región Continental.

Stadiums

References

External links
FEGUIFUT

Football leagues in Equatorial Guinea
Football
Football
Equatorial Guinea